The Strap Iron Corral, located about  north of Hooper, Washington, is a historic corral built in the 1870s by "Uncle Jim" Kennedy.

It was listed on the National Register of Historic Places in 1975.

See also
 National Register of Historic Places listings in Washington

References

Corrals
Infrastructure completed in 1878
Agricultural buildings and structures on the National Register of Historic Places in Washington (state)
National Register of Historic Places in Adams County, Washington